Bouilly is the name or part of the name of the following communes in France:

 Bouilly, Aube, in the Aube department
 Bouilly, Marne, in the Marne department
 Bouilly-en-Gâtinais, in the Loiret department

People 
 Jean-Nicolas Bouilly, author